This article contains information about the literary events and publications of 1715.

Events
c. August – Nicholas Rowe becomes the Poet Laureate of Great Britain.
The first record of the actress and writer Eliza Haywood tells of her performing in Thomas Shadwell's Shakespeare adaptation, Timon of Athens; or, The Man-Hater at the Smock Alley Theatre, Dublin.

New books

Prose
Joseph Addison – The Free-Holder (periodical)
Jane Barker – Exilius; or, The Banished Roman
Richard Bentley – A Sermon upon Popery
Samuel Croxall – The Vision
Daniel Defoe 
An Appeal to Honour and Justice
The Family Instructor
A Hymn to the Mob
Elizabeth Elstob – The Rudiments of Grammar for the English-Saxon Tongue, first given in English; with an apology for the study of northern antiquities, the first grammar of Old English
Thomas-Simon Gueullette – Les Mille et un quarts-d’heure, contes tartares (The Thousand and One Quarters of an Hour, Tartarian Tales)
Alain-René Lesage (anonymous) – L'Histoire de Gil Blas de Santillane (Books 1–6)
Charles Montagu – The Works and Life of the Late Earl of Halifax
Jonathan Richardson – An Essay on the Theory of Painting
"Captain" Alexander Smith – The Secret History of the Lives of the Most Celebrated Beauties, Ladies of Quality, and Jilts
Richard Steele
The Englishman: Second Series (periodical)
Town-Talk (periodical)

Children
Isaac Watts – Divine Songs Attempted in Easy Language for the Use of Children

Drama
 Christopher Bullock – A Woman's Revenge
Henry Carey – The Contrivances
Susanna Centlivre – The Gotham Election (not performed because of political content)
Chikamatsu Monzaemon – The Battles of Coxinga (国姓爺合戦, Kokusen'ya Kassen)
Charles Rivière Dufresny – La Coquette de village 
John Gay – The What D'Ye Call It
Benjamin Griffin 
Injured Virtue; or, The Virgin Martyr
Love in a Sack
Newburgh Hamilton – The Doating Lovers
Charles Johnson – The Country Lasses
 Charles Knipe – A City Ramble
Charles Molloy – The Perplexed Couple
Nicholas Rowe -The Tragedy of Lady Jane Grey
Lewis Theobald – The Perfidious Brother (allegedly plagiarized, staged the following year)
John Vanbrugh – The Country House

Poetry

Charles Cotton – The Genuine Works of Charles Cotton
Alexander Pope 
The Temple of Fame (based on Chaucer)
The Iliad of Homer vol. i.
Thomas Tickell – The First Book of Homer's Iliad
Isaac Watts 
Divine Songs
A Guide to Prayer

Births
January 14 (baptised) – Frances Vane, Viscountess Vane (Lady Fanny), English memoirist (died 1788)
January 26 or February 26 – Claude Adrien Helvétius, French philosophical writer (died 1771)
June 4 (c. 1715–1724) – Cao Xueqin, Chinese writer (died 1763)
September 30 – Étienne Bonnot de Condillac, French philosophical writer (died 1780)
October 1 – Richard Jago, English poet (died 1781)
Probable year of birth
John Hawkesworth, English writer and editor (died 1773)
Alexander Russell, Scottish physician and naturalist (died 1768)

Deaths
January 7 – François Fénelon, French archbishop, theologian, poet and writer (born 1651)
February 25 – Pu Songling (蒲松齡), Qing Dynasty Chinese writer (born 1640)
March 8 – William Dampier, English explorer and writer (born 1651)
March 17 – Gilbert Burnet, Scottish theologian and historian (born 1643)
July 30 – Nahum Tate, Irish poet and hymnist (born 1652)
October 13 – Nicolas Malebranche, French priest and rationalist philosopher (born 1638)
Unknown date – Mary Monck, Irish poet (date of birth unknown)

References

 
Years of the 18th century in literature